The 1968–69 SK Rapid Wien season was the 71st season in club history.

Squad

Squad and statistics

Squad statistics

Fixtures and results

League

Cup

European Cup

References

1968-69 Rapid Wien Season
Rapid